Streptothyris is a genus of moth in the family Cosmopterigidae.

Species
Streptothyris tanyacta Meyrick, 1918

References

Natural History Museum Lepidoptera genus database

Endemic moths of South Africa
Cosmopterigidae